Margaret Maria Verney (née Hay-Williams or Williams-Hay) (3 December 1844 – 7 October 1930), was an English-born Welsh educationist.

Verney was the daughter of Lady Sarah Elizabeth Amherst and her husband John Hay-Williams, 2nd Baronet Williams of Bodelwyddan. On the death of her father in 1859, she inherited his house "Rhianfa", on Anglesey, which she retained as a family home.

In 1868 she married Sir Edmund Hope Verney, MP, then merely Captain Verney. She became a leading campaigner for girls' education in the UK. In 1894 she became a member of the Statutory Council of the University of Wales, holding the position until 1922. In 1904 she produced an edition of the Memoirs of the Verney Family during the Seventeenth Century.  She also contributed to the Dictionary of National Biography.

Sources
R. F. Verney et al. – In Memory of Margaret Maria Lady Verney (1930)

Further reading
Oxford Dictionary of National Biography, Verney [née Hay Williams], Margaret Maria, Lady Verney (1844–1930), historian and promoter of higher education in Wales, by H. E. D. Blakiston, rev. H. J. Spencer

References

1844 births
1930 deaths
Margaret
English educational theorists
Daughters of baronets
Wives of baronets